Bila Krynytsia is an inhabited locality in Ukraine and it may stand for:

Urban-type settlements
 Bila Krynytsia in Kherson Oblast, Velyka Oleksandrivka Raion
 Bila Krynytsia in Zhytomyr Oblast, Radomyshl Raion

Villages
 Bila Krynytsia, Chernivtsi Oblast in Chernivtsi Oblast, Hlyboka Raion
 Bila Krynytsia, Mykolaiv Oblast in Mykolaiv Oblast, Bereznehuvate Raion
 Bila Krynytsia, Rivne Oblast in Rivne Oblast, Rivne Raion
 Bila Krynytsia, Ternopil Oblast in Ternopil Oblast, Kremenets Raion